Mederdra is a small town and commune in south-west Mauritania, near the border of Senegal. In 2000 it had a population of 6,858.

Transport 

It lies on the route of a proposed railway line to connect phosphate mines at Kaédi with the capital and port of Nouakchott.

Famous citizens
Malouma Meidah, a popular singer and politician, was born in Mederdra in 1960.

Horma Ould Babana, politician, was born here on 12 March 1912.

See also 
 Transport in Mauritania
 Railway stations in Mauritania

References 

Communes of Trarza Region